Malenovice is a municipality and village in Frýdek-Místek District in the Moravian-Silesian Region of the Czech Republic. It has about 800 inhabitants.

Etymology
The name is derived from malina, i.e. "raspberry". They grew abundantly here at the time the village was founded.

Geography
Malenovice lies in the historical region of Cieszyn Silesia. Most of the municipal territory lies in the Moravian-Silesian Beskids, a small part on the northwest lies in the Moravian-Silesian Foothills.

History
The first written mention of Malenovice is from 1610. It was then a part of the Frýdek state country, which was a part of the Kingdom of Bohemia.

References

External links

 

Villages in Frýdek-Místek District
Cieszyn Silesia